Everybody Dance Now was an Australian reality television dance competition that premiered on 12 August 2012 on Network Ten. The show was produced by FremantleMedia Australia, and hosted by Sarah Murdoch.

Everybody Dance Now was open to solo acts, duos and groups of any age, style or size. They were divided into two teams, with each being led by the dance masters Jason Derülo and Kelly Rowland, who would "challenge, train and mentor" their acts. The teams faced a studio audience in each episode "to do battle in a colosseum-style dance duel." During the heats stage of the competition, eight acts would perform in each episode, with two acts winning $10,000 and progressing through to the finals to compete for the ultimate prize of $250,000.

On 21 August 2012, as ratings were dwindling, Network Ten considered changing the weekly schedule for the show, from three half-hour episodes to one full hour episode a week, but when those plans fell through, it decided to cancel the show due to poor ratings. The prize money was then donated to charity.

Overview

Format
Everybody Dance Now consisted of two phases: heats and finals. The show was open to dancers of all ages and styles, who were divided into two teams, with each being taken under the guidance of big name entertainment celebrities known as the dance masters, to do battle in a colosseum-style duel. During the heats stage of the competition, eight acts would perform during each episode in four duels. Once each duel was complete, the studio audience would vote for the act they think should progress through to the dance duel decider round. During this round, the studio audience would vote again for the two acts they think should win $10,000 and progress through to the finals. During the finals, dance acts would compete for the ultimate prize of $250,000. But there turned out to be no finals, and of course, no winners, due to the show's cancellation.

Production
Everybody Dance Now was filmed at a location in Melbourne with a live studio audience.

Series summary

International versions

References

Network 10 original programming
2010s Australian reality television series
2012 Australian television series debuts
2012 Australian television series endings
Everybody Dance Now
Dance competition television shows
English-language television shows
Television series by Fremantle (company)